Henney may refer to:

People 
 Árpád Henney (1895–1980), Hungarian politician and military officer
 Charles W. Henney (1884–1969), member of the United States House of Representatives from Wisconsin
 Dagmar R. Henney (born 1931), mathematician and professor at George Washington University
 Daniel Henney (born 1979), Korean American actor and model
 Jane E. Henney (born 1947), MD, physician, commissioner of the U.S. Food and Drug Administration
 Del Henney (1935–2019), British character actor
 Katie Henney (born 1993), American child actress
 Kevlin Henney, British technology writer

Businesses 

 Henney Kilowatt, a French-American electric car
 Henney Motor Company, manufacturer of bodies for motor vehicles